Major Adrian Edmund Hopkins MC (8 October 1894 – 1 March 1967) was a British philatelist who signed the Roll of Distinguished Philatelists in 1947. He was wounded during World War I and lost an arm. Hopkins was the President and a founder member of the Postal History Society and three times Mayor of Bath (1937, 1938 and 1953).

Selected publications
Talks about postage stamps - Philately in Bristol. 1927. 
A history of wreck covers originating at sea, on land, and in the air. 1940.

References

Signatories to the Roll of Distinguished Philatelists
1894 births
1967 deaths
British philatelists
Mayors of Bath, Somerset
Recipients of the Military Cross
People from Bath, Somerset
Royal Artillery officers
British Army personnel of World War I
British stamp dealers
British amputees
20th-century British businesspeople